The Collective for Research and Training on Development-Action (CRTD.A) is a Lebanon-based non-governmental organization started in July 1999. CRTDA works with partner civil society organizations in Lebanon and across the Arab World primarily in Yemen, Egypt, Syria, Morocco, Tunisia, and Algeria. CRTD.A seeks to contribute to the social development of local communities and organizations through enhancing capacities particularly in gender analysis, gender and development, poverty and exclusion, for the purpose of contributing to creating a more just and equitable environment.

Projects 
 The Machreq/Maghreb Gender Linking and Information Project (MACMAG GLIP)
 Independent Resources and Information Services (IRIS)
 Sustainable Economic Opportunities for Women (SEOW)
 Women Economic Empowerment Project (WEEP)
 Active Citizenship and Gendered Social Entitlements (ACGEN)
 The Arab Women's Right to Nationality Campaign (WRN)
 Faith Based Organizations (FBO) Research Project
 The Lebanon Development Gateway (LDG)

See also 
 OXFAM
 International Development Research Centre

External links
 CRTDA website
 The Machreq/Maghreb Gender Linking and Information Project website
 Independent Resources and Information Services Project website
 Sustainable Economic Opportunities for Women Project website
 Women Economic Empowerment Project Project website
 Active Citizenship and Gendered Social Entitlements Project website
 The Arab Women's Right to Nationality Campaign Project website
 Faith Based Organizations (FBO) Research Project website
 The Lebanon Development Gateway website

References 

1999 establishments in Lebanon
Human rights organisations based in Lebanon
Economic development organizations
Women's rights organizations
Organizations established in 1999